Cecil Moore may refer to:

 Cecil B. Moore (1915–1979), Philadelphia lawyer and civil rights activist
Cecil B. Moore, Philadelphia, a neighborhood in the city of Philadelphia
Cecil B. Moore station
 Cecil Moore (RAF officer), British RAF officer
 Cecil Moore (soccer) (born 1926), Irish soccer goalkeeper
 Cecil Moore (architect) (1913–2009), architect and developer in Tucson, Arizona
 Cecil Moore (weightlifter) (born 1929), Guyanese Olympic weightlifter

Moore, Cecil